Rupert Sumner Ryan,  (6 May 1884 – 25 August 1952) was an Australian soldier and politician.

Early life
Ryan was born in Melbourne to surgeon Sir Charles Snodgrass Ryan and Alice Elfrida, née Sumner. He had one sister, Ethel Marian "Maie" Sumner, would later marry Richard Casey. Ryan attended Geelong Church of England Grammar School 1895–98 before travelling to England to complete his education at Harrow School and the Royal Military Academy, Woolwich.

Military service
In 1904, Ryan was commissioned in the Royal Artillery. At the outset of the First World War, he was stationed on the Western Front. At the end of the war (1918) he was a lieutenant colonel, and was awarded three foreign honours and the Distinguished Service Order in 1918, having been wounded in 1915 in the Battle of Festubert.

Ryan was the chief of staff to the governor of Cologne in 1919, and was shifted to the Inter-Allied Rhineland High Commission headquarters in 1920. He married Lady Rosemary Constance Hay, the daughter of the high commissioner the Earl of Erroll, at the British consulate on 29 May 1924. They had one child, Patrick Vincent Charles Ryan, and divorced in 1935, whereafter he returned to Victoria to Edrington, the property he had inherited near Berwick. He and his sister built the station into a very successful Romney Marsh stud; he also built a landing strip there in 1939.

Ryan was appointed a Companion of the Order of St Michael and St George in 1928, and acted as high commissioner following Erroll's death until the end of the occupation. At his retirement from the army in 1929, he became an arms salesman with Vickers Ltd, in which capacity he travelled to Moscow and Bangkok. He resigned in 1934.
At the outbreak of the Second World War, Ryan joined the Australian Military Forces, holding administrative posts until 1940, when he was elected to the Australian House of Representatives for Flinders as a member of the United Australia Party.

Federal politics

Ryan was not particularly prominent in Parliament, serving on joint committees on social security (1941–46) and foreign affairs (1952), the latter of which he was the chairman. He was described by Enid Lyons as "a doughty champion of women". Ryan remained in Parliament until his sudden death of cardiac failure on 25 August 1952; he was cremated, and survived by his son.

References
 

1884 births
1952 deaths
United Australia Party members of the Parliament of Australia
Liberal Party of Australia members of the Parliament of Australia
Members of the Australian House of Representatives
Members of the Australian House of Representatives for Flinders
Australian Companions of the Order of St Michael and St George
Military personnel from Melbourne
Politicians from Melbourne
20th-century Australian politicians
People educated at Geelong Grammar School
People educated at Harrow School
Graduates of the Royal Military Academy, Woolwich
Chevaliers of the Légion d'honneur
Recipients of the Order of the Sacred Treasure, 3rd class
Commanders of the Order of Aviz
Royal Artillery officers
British Army personnel of World War I
Australian Companions of the Distinguished Service Order